Chang Show-foong (born 29 March 1941) is a Taiwanese environmentalist, writer, and politician. She was elected to the Legislative Yuan in 2012 and served until her resignation in March 2013.

Education and literary career
Chang is a native of Jinhua, and moved to Taiwan in 1949. She studied Chinese literature at Soochow University, graduating in 1962. She has taught at her alma mater, and also at Hong Kong Baptist Theological Seminary and National Yang-Ming University. Most of her works incorporate historical events as allegories to modern times.

Activism
Chang made her opposition to the construction of a biotechnology park in Nangang District, Taipei known in 2010, having described the area as "Taipei's last piece of green land." Her advocacy featured direct visits to the site, where she favored the retention of the area's natural wetlands as "Taipei's Central Park." Chang also supported the maintenance of Pingtung County's Alangyi Trail. She has compared substandard care of public greenery to foot binding.

Political career
She was named to the Legislative Yuan via the proportional representation party list system as a representative of the People First Party.  As a legislator, Chang continued supporting a wide range of green causes. In March 2012, she proposed that the government provide aid to single women, advising Taiwanese men against transnational marriage, calling the practice a "strange habit." Chang's comments drew criticism from multiple civic groups. She resigned from the legislature on 15 March 2013.

References

1941 births
Living people
Taiwanese women novelists
Taiwanese environmentalists
Taiwanese people from Zhejiang
Republic of China politicians from Zhejiang
Party List Members of the Legislative Yuan
People First Party Members of the Legislative Yuan
Members of the 8th Legislative Yuan
21st-century Taiwanese women politicians
Soochow University (Taiwan) alumni
Academic staff of Soochow University (Taiwan)
Taiwanese dramatists and playwrights
Educators from Jinhua
Politicians from Jinhua
Writers from Jinhua
Taiwanese women academics
Chinese women short story writers
Taiwanese women short story writers
20th-century Taiwanese short story writers
20th-century Taiwanese writers
20th-century Taiwanese women writers
21st-century Taiwanese writers
21st-century Taiwanese women writers
Republic of China short story writers
Short story writers from Zhejiang
Taiwanese women environmentalists